The ninth edition of the European Race Walking Cup was held on the roads of Olhão, Portugal on 21 May 2011. The event was jointly organised by the Federação Portuguesa de Atletismo (Portuguese Athletics Federation) and the European Athletics Association. A total of 222 athletes from 26 countries participated in the competition.

Olhão won the nomination as the host city in November 2009, seeing off a rival bid from Spain's Santa Eulària des Riu. Although this was Portugal's first time hosting a racewalking event of this size, it became another high profile athletics competition to be staged in the Algarve region, after the 2000 IAAF World Cross Country Championships, 2003 IAAF World Half Marathon Championships and several editions of the European Champion Clubs Cup. The city itself has, since 2001, played host to the annual Meeting de Marcha Atlética da Cidade de Olhão racewalking meeting, which has featured on the IAAF World Race Walking Challenge series.

As in previous years, the competition featured five races: two 20 km walk competitions for men and women, a 50 km men's walk, and junior walks for men and women of 10 km each. The course was a looped circuit on the roads next to Olhão's marina on the seafront of the Atlantic Ocean. Russia and Italy were the dominant teams at the competition, taking three and two team titles respectively. Italian men took a sweep of the top three in the 20 km race while Russia's junior men completed a 1–2 finish to gain a perfect team score.

Medallists

Men

Women

Results
Complete results were published.

Men's 20 km

Team (20 km Men)

Men's 50 km

Team (50 km Men)

Men's 10 km (Junior)

Team (10 km Junior Men)

Women's 20 km

Team (20 km Women)

Women's 10 km Junior

Team (10 km Junior Women)

Participation
The participation of 218 athletes (134 men/84 women) from 25 countries is reported.

 (7)
 (6)
 (1)
 (3)
 (8)
 (13)
 (7)
 (8)
 (10)
 (18)
 (8)
 (7)
 (1)
 (15)
 (14)
 (4)
 (18)
 (3)
 (8)
 (18)
 (5)
 (3)
 (7)
 (17)
 (10)

References

Results
Official website results. Olhao2011. Retrieved on 2011-05-30.

External links
Official website
Articles on European Athletics website

2011
2011 in athletics (track and field)
European Race Walk
Race
2011 in European sport